African tetras (family Alestidae, formerly spelled Alestiidae) are a group of characiform fish exclusively found in Africa. This family contains about 18 genera and 119 species. Among the best known members are the Congo tetra, and African tigerfish.

Taxonomy
Taxonomy based on Van der Laan 2017 and Nelson, Grande & Wilson 2016.
 Family Alestiidae Cockerell 1910
 Genus †Alestoides Monod & Gaudant 1998
 Genus †Arabocharax Micklich & Roscher 1990
 Genus †Bunocharax Van Neer 1994
 Genus †Eurocharax Gaudant 1980
 Genus †Mahengecharax Murray 2003
 Genus †Sindacharax Greenwood & Howes 1975
 Genus Brycinus Valenciennes 1850 [Brycinus macrolepidotus species-group]
 Subfamily Bryconaethiopinae Hoedeman 1951
 Genus Bryconaethiops Günther 1873
 Genus Brachyalestes Günther 1864 [Brycinus nurse species-group]
 Subfamily Petersiinae Poll 1967
 Genus Alestopetersius Hoedeman 1951 [Duboisialestes Poll 1967]
 Genus Bathyaethiops Fowler 1949
 Genus Brachypetersius (Fowler 1956)
 Genus Clupeocharax Pellégrin 1926
 Genus Nannopetersius (Hoedeman 1956)
 Genus Petersius Hilgendorf 1894
 Genus Phenacogrammus Eigenmann 1907
 Genus Tricuspidalestes Poll 1967
 Subfamily Alestinae Roberts 1969
 Genus Alestes Müller & Troschel 1844
 Genus Bryconalestes Hoedeman 1951 [Brycinus longipinnis species-group]
 Genus Hemigrammopetersius Pellégrin 1926
 Genus Hydrocynus (Cuvier 1816)
 Genus Ladigesia Géry 1968
 Genus Micralestes Boulenger 1899
 Genus Rhabdalestes  (Hoedeman 1951)

References 

 

Ray-finned fish families